Maruyama Tameike is an earthfill dam located in Yamanashi Prefecture in Japan. The dam is used for flood control and irrigation. The catchment area of the dam is 4.1 km2. The dam impounds about 26  ha of land when full and can store 1450 thousand cubic meters of water. The construction of the dam was completed in 1988.

References

Dams in Yamanashi Prefecture
1988 establishments in Japan